Emperor Range is a mountain range in northern part of the island of Bougainville, Papua New Guinea. Several volcanoes are located in the range, including highest point of the island - Mount Balbi.

References

Mountain ranges of Papua New Guinea
Volcanoes of Bougainville Island